is a railway station on the Shinetsu Main Line in the city of Kashiwazaki, Niigata Prefecture, Japan, operated by East Japan Railway Company (JR East).

Lines

Layout
The station is unstaffed and consists of two opposed side platforms connected by a footbridge.

Platforms

History
The station was opened on 28 July 1899. With the privatization of Japanese National Railways (JNR) on 1 April 1987, the station came under the control of JR East.

On 17 July 2007, the station and line was damaged and blocked by a landslide caused by the 2007 Chūetsu offshore earthquake. The line reopened to traffic on 13 September 2007. A new station building was completed on 25 March 2008.

Surrounding area
 Ōmigawa Swimming Beach

See also
 List of railway stations in Japan

References

External links

 JR East station information 

Railway stations in Japan opened in 1899
Railway stations in Niigata Prefecture
Shin'etsu Main Line
Stations of East Japan Railway Company
Kashiwazaki, Niigata